Southern Nuclear, headquartered in Birmingham, Ala., is a nuclear energy facility operators and involved in advanced nuclear technologies research. The company operates a total of six units for Alabama Power and Georgia Power at the Joseph M. Farley Nuclear Plant near Dothan, Ala.; the Edwin I. Hatch Nuclear Plant near Baxley, Ga., and the Alvin W. Vogtle Electric Generating Plant near Waynesboro, Ga. Southern Nuclear is the licensee of two new nuclear units currently under construction at Plant Vogtle, which are among the first nuclear units being constructed in the United States in more than 30 years.

Southern Nuclear's reliability has a current average three-year fleet capacity factor of 93.2 percent, exceeding the U.S. average of 91.2 percent for the years 2013–2015.

Nuclear Power Generating Facilities

Plant Farley
The Joseph M. Farley Nuclear Plant is located on 1,850 acres along the Chattahoochee River near Dothan in southeast Alabama. Construction of the plant began in 1970. Unit 1 achieved commercial operation in December 1977. Unit 2 began commercial operation in July 1981. The total cost of the plant was about $1.57 billion.

Each unit is capable of generating 900 megawatts of electric power for a total capacity of 1,800 mW. The plant is powered by Westinghouse pressurized water reactors. The containment building, which houses the reactor, the reactor coolant system and other nuclear-related components, is constructed of reinforced concrete and carbon steel.

Plant Hatch
The Edwin I. Hatch Electric Generating Plant sits on a 2,224-acre site along the Altamaha, Georgia's largest river, near Baxley, Ga. It is jointly owned by Georgia Power (50.1 percent), Oglethorpe Power Corporation (30 percent), Municipal Electrical Authority of Georgia (17.7 percent) and Dalton Utilities (2.2 percent).

Construction of the plant began in 1968. Unit 1 began commercial operation in December 1975.

Unit 2 began commercial operation in September 1979. Units 1 and 2 are rated at 924 megawatts of electric power each for a total capacity of 1,848 mW. The plant is powered by boiling water reactors supplied by General Electric Company.

Plant Vogtle
Unit 1 began commercial operation in May 1987. Unit 2 began commercial operation in May 1989. Each unit is capable of generating 1,215 megawatts of electric power for a total capacity of 2,430 mW. The plant is powered by pressurized water reactors manufactured by Westinghouse. The turbines and electric generators are manufactured by General Electric.

Nuclear Development 
Southern Nuclear is overseeing the licensing and construction of two new nuclear units at the Plant Vogtle site near Augusta, Ga. Vogtle 3 and 4 will be among the first new nuclear plants built in America in more than 30 years.

The construction of the new Vogtle units currently employs more than 5,000 people and will create 800 permanent jobs when the facility begins operating. Due to setbacks from the Chapter 11 bankruptcy of reactor supplier Westinghouse, Vogtle units 3 and 4 are scheduled to be operational in 2022 and 2023, respectively.

References

External links
 Southern Nuclear's Website

Southern Company
Companies based in Birmingham, Alabama
Nuclear power companies of the United States